Tuffley is a suburb in the city of Gloucester and one of the fifteen wards of the English city of Gloucester. The ward, which is non-parished and situated near Robinswood Hill toward the south of the city, has services including schools, shops and a park.

Origins
Tuffley is a suburb of Gloucester, in the county of Gloucestershire. Recorded as Tuffley, Tufley, Tufly, Tuffel, Tuffill and possibly others, this suburb was once a village mentioned in the Domesday Book of 1086 as 'Tuffelege', which suggests a meaning of Tuffa's farm, with Tuffa being an Anglo-Saxon personal name. To this was added the suffix 'leah,' meaning a fenced enclosure or farm.

In 1891 the parish had a population of 872. On 9 November 1900 the parish was abolished and became part of Gloucester, Whaddon and Quedgeley.

In 1900, Lower Tuffley was moved into the parish of Quedgeley.

Religion
Four local churches have a base in Tuffley: St George's (Church of England) is on Grange Road, Lower Tuffley and St Barnabas (Church of England) is on Stroud Road. The tower of St Barnabas is a local landmark. English Martyrs (Roman Catholic) is on Tuffley Lane and the Grange Baptist Church (Baptist) is also on Grange Road.

Amenities and transport
There are two public houses in the Tuffley area, the Pike and Musket and the Fox and Elm. There are 2 libraries, a community centre, a sports centre, and a shopping centre.

Sport
Tuffley Rovers F.C., a football team based in the ward, were formed in 1929 and play at Glevum Park in Gloucester operating five Saturday adult sides, a veterans team and a full youth section. Their best result in the FA Cup was a 2nd qualifying round defeat in 1999–2000 to Lymington & New Milton, while they reached the 2nd round in the FA Vase in the 1994–95 season.

References

External links

Parks within Gloucester

Areas of Gloucester
Former civil parishes in Gloucestershire